The 15 cm Kanone 16 (15 cm K 16) was a heavy field gun used by Germany in World War I and World War II. Guns turned over to Belgium as reparations after World War I were taken into Wehrmacht service after the conquest of Belgium as the 15 cm K 429(b). It generally served on coast-defense duties during World War II.

Design

The K 16 was a thoroughly conventional design for its day with a box trail, steel wheels for motor transport and a curved gunshield. The axle was suspended on a traverse leaf spring. For transport the barrel was generally detached from the recoil system and moved on its own trailer. In 1941 a small number of K 16 barrels were placed on 21 cm Mrs 18 carriages to become the 15 cm K 16 in Mrs Laf.

Ammunition
It fired 2 types of high-explosive shells, which differed only in which fuzes they could accept. It used a three part charge in its cartridge case.

See also

Weapons of comparable role, performance and era
BL 6 inch Gun Mk XIX British equivalent
Canon de 155mm GPF French equivalent

References

Citations

Sources 

 Engelmann, Joachim and Scheibert, Horst. Deutsche Artillerie 1934-1945: Eine Dokumentation in Text, Skizzen und Bildern: Ausrüstung, Gliederung, Ausbildung, Führung, Einsatz. Limburg/Lahn, Germany: C. A. Starke, 1974.
 Gander, Terry and Chamberlain, Peter. Weapons of the Third Reich: An Encyclopedic Survey of All Small Arms, Artillery and Special Weapons of the German Land Forces 1939-1945. New York: Doubleday, 1979. .
 Hogg, Ian V. German Artillery of World War Two. 2nd corrected edition. Mechanicsville, PA: Stackpole Books, 1997. .

External links

 the K 16 on Landships
 List and pictures of World War I surviving 15cm K 16 guns

Field artillery of Germany
World War I artillery of Germany
World War II field artillery
World War II artillery of Germany
150 mm artillery
Weapons and ammunition introduced in 1917